Search retargeting is a form of retargeting employed by online marketers that target an audience based on the previous searches they conduct on other websites. Unlike site retargeting, search retargeting is designed to find new customers which have likely never been to a marketer's website before.

While search advertising is a method of placing online advertisements within the results of search engine queries, search retargeting attempts to extend the interaction with the same searchers when they move away from search query results pages to other online activities and websites. Search retargeting ads are typically displayed as display ads.

See also
 Email retargeting
 Link retargeting
 Site retargeting

References

Behavioral retargeting
Digital marketing